The Women's 30 kilometre freestyle at the FIS Nordic World Ski Championships 2011 was held on 5 March 2011 at 12:00 CET. Poland's Justyna Kowalczyk is both the defending world and Olympic champion. Norwegian Therese Johaug won after a dash in the steepest hills giving her the lead for most of the race.

Results

References

FIS Nordic World Ski Championships 2011
2011 in Norwegian women's sport